Kopiec may refer to:

 Kopiec, Tomaszów Mazowiecki County in Łódź Voivodeship (central Poland)
 Kopiec, Lublin Voivodeship (east Poland)
 Kopiec, Podlaskie Voivodeship (north-east Poland)
 Kopiec, Wieluń County in Łódź Voivodeship (central Poland)
 Kopiec, Świętokrzyskie Voivodeship (south-central Poland)
 Kopiec, Masovian Voivodeship (east-central Poland)
 Kopiec, Silesian Voivodeship (south Poland)